Max Jowitt (born ) is an English professional rugby league footballer who plays as a  for Wakefield Trinity in the Super League.

He has spent time on loan from Wakefield at the Dewsbury Rams the Championship, and Oxford and the Newcastle Thunder in League 1.

Background
Jowitt was born in Wakefield, West Yorkshire, England. He is the son of the rugby league footballer who played in the 1980s and 1990s for Wakefield Trinity; Ian Jowitt.

Career

International career
In July 2018 he was selected in the England Knights Performance squad.

References

External links
Wakefield Trinity profile
SL profile

1997 births
Living people
Dewsbury Rams players
England Knights national rugby league team players
English rugby league players
Newcastle Thunder players
Oxford Rugby League players
Rugby league fullbacks
Rugby league players from Wakefield
Wakefield Trinity players